The Coughlin Campanile was completed on the campus of South Dakota State University (SDSU) in 1929.  It was designed by architects Perkins & McWayne.  It was listed on the National Register of Historic Places in 1987.

Per its National Register nomination, it "is considered by many as the most outstanding chimes tower in South Dakota. As the tallest campanile in the state, the structure is an important landmark for the campus of South Dakota State University and to the city of Brookings."

At a cost of $75,000, it was a gift to the University from Charles Coughlin, a graduate from the class of 1909.  The Campanile is a chimes tower that rises to 165 feet with 180 steps to the top observation platform open to the public, and is located on Medary Avenue. The tower's chimes cover three octaves and can be "played" manually from an organ in the nearby Lincoln Music Hall.  The Campanile also appears in SDSU's business logo and on most letterheads.

In August 2000, as a part of "Visions for the Future" campaign, over 4,000 alumni and businesses donated a total of $540,000 to have the Campanile restored. This restoration included mortar work and replacement of parts of the limestone base.

For many years the Coughlin Campanile was the tallest structure in South Dakota, and is today an iconic structure both on campus, and across the larger Brookings community.

Its distinctive red lamp at the top is a familiar beacon on a dark prairie night that welcomes travelers from dozens of miles away.

The chime does not work at this time.

References

Selected Campanile Resources
Building Information

South Dakota State University
University and college buildings on the National Register of Historic Places in South Dakota
Towers in South Dakota
Bell towers in the United States
Buildings and structures in Brookings, South Dakota
Towers completed in 1929
National Register of Historic Places in Brookings County, South Dakota